Rosa María Posada Chapado (Madrid, 17 January 1940 — Madrid, 29 October 2014) was a Spanish lawyer and politician. She served as President of the Assembly of Madrid (1987-1991) as well as Vice President.

References 

20th-century Spanish lawyers
2014 deaths
Deaths from lung cancer
Lawyers from Madrid
1940 births
Democratic and Social Centre (Spain) politicians
People's Party (Spain) politicians
Presidents of the Assembly of Madrid
Members of the 2nd Assembly of Madrid
Members of the 4th Assembly of Madrid
Members of the 5th Assembly of Madrid
Members of the 6th Assembly of Madrid
Members of the 7th Assembly of Madrid
Members of the 8th Assembly of Madrid
Members of the 9th Assembly of Madrid
First Secretaries of the Assembly of Madrid
First Vice Presidents of the Assembly of Madrid
Government ministers of the Community of Madrid
Members of the People's Parliamentary Group (Assembly of Madrid)